Vladimir Šišljagić, born in 1957 in Osijek is Croatian cardiac surgeon and politician. Šišljagić is the leader of Croatian Democratic Alliance of Slavonia and Baranja, a regionalist and right wing populist political party in Croatia.

References

1957 births
Living people
People from Osijek
Croatian Democratic Alliance of Slavonia and Baranja politicians
Croatian cardiac surgeons
University of Sarajevo alumni